is a Japanese company which manufactures figurines and garage kits. Its headquarters is in Kadoma, Osaka Prefecture. While the company mostly focuses on anime related characters, it recently has acquired other licenses, e.g. King Kong, and some Godzilla characters.

Kaiyodo was originally a small shop in Japan, but grew into a famous company over the years, leading them to sell collectables worldwide. One of their most famous sculptors is Bome, who is most well known for his Mon-sieur BOME collection. In recent years, his figurines have become well known and sought by collectors, and his works have been displayed on a worldwide scale at conventions, including Paris, Tokyo etc.

Revoltech
  is a portmanteau for "Revolver Technology," in reference to the unique "Revolver Joint" articulation which all of the figures in this particular series utilize. This gives the figures a wide range of motion and stability, allowing for many dynamic and varied poses.

The subject matter for the Revoltech line can be broadly split into four categories: Real Robot, Super Robot, Humanoid and Creature.  Thus far, robots and characters from anime, video games, manga, tokusatsu, film and television have been covered. The revolver joint is composed of three pieces, two half spheres whose flat sections provide the friction surface for the articulation, and a cross section pin that locks the whole assembly into place. Both half-spheres have round cylindrical pegs used to connect the different body parts of any given figure.

References

External links

  
 Kaiyodo: Revoltech Site
 Shaft Enterprises - A Patlabor Website - The Fridge (Patlabor Database) - Models and Figures List - Garage Kits

2000s toys
Action figures
Anime companies
Companies based in Osaka Prefecture
Figurine manufacturers
Godzilla (franchise)
Japanese brands
Mass media in Kadoma, Osaka
Patlabor
Super robot anime and manga
Toy companies of Japan
Toy companies established in 1964
Japanese companies established in 1964
Toy robots